Justice A.Varadarajan (1920-2009) was a judge of Supreme Court of India.

Early life 

A. Varadarajan was born into Scheduled Caste family at Jolarpettai, Vellore district, Madras Presidency. He was inspired by Iyothee Thass, a pioneer in Dalit activism, during his youth days. He did his matriculation from Municipal High School at Tirupattur, intermediate from Voorhees College, (Vellore), B.A. from Loyola College (Madras) and LLB from Dr. Ambedkar Government Law College (Madras).

Career 
In 1944 he was enrolled as a lawyer and practised in civil and criminal on the original and appellate sides. Later he got promoted as Sub-Judge, District and Sessions Judge, Additional Judge and Permanent Judge in 1974.

In 1980 he was nominated as the judge of Supreme Court of India being the first Dalit to reach such position.

Varadarajan retired in 1985 and joined Prakash Ambedkar in their struggles for implementing reservations and seeking actions against violence on Dalits.

References 

Indian judges
20th-century Indian judges
1920 births
2009 deaths
Dalit people